Sander Arends and David Pel were the defending champions but chose not to defend their title.

Pedro Cachín and Facundo Mena won the title after defeating Orlando Luz and Felipe Meligeni Alves 7–5, 6–3 in the final.

Seeds

Draw

References

External links
 Main draw

Tampere Open - Doubles